Groombridge 1830 (also known as 1830 Groombridge or  Argelander's Star) is a star in the constellation Ursa Major.

Description
It is a yellow-hued class G8 subdwarf catalogued by British astronomer Stephen Groombridge with the Groombridge Transit Circle between 1806 and the 1830s and published posthumously in his star catalog, Catalogue of Circumpolar Stars (1838). Its high proper motion was noted by Friedrich Wilhelm Argelander in 1842.

It is a member of the galactic halo; such stars account for only 0.1 to 0.2 percent of the stars near the Sun. Like most halo stars, it has a low abundance of elements other than hydrogen and helium—what astronomers term a metal-poor star.

Once suspected of being a binary star with a period of 175 days, current consensus is that it is single. Previous suspected observations of a stellar companion were probably "superflares"—analogous to the Sun's solar flares, but hundreds to millions of times more energetic. It had one of the first nine identified superflares.

Proper motion
When discovered, it had the highest proper motion of any star known, replacing 61 Cygni in that department. Later it dropped to second place after the discovery of Kapteyn's Star, and still later to third place after the discovery of Barnard's Star. It is considerably farther away than either of those stars, however, which means its transverse velocity is greater.

See also
 List of star systems within 25–30 light-years

References

External links

SolStation.com: Groombridge 1830
AN 19 (1842) 393/394 (in German)
AN 20 (1843) 163/164 (in German)
AN 20 (1843) 279/280

Ursa Major (constellation)
Binary stars
G-type subdwarfs
Groombridge, 1830
1830
103095
High-proper-motion stars
Stars with proper names
4550
057939
Durchmusterung objects
0451
TIC objects